Canarium subulatum  is a tropical forest tree species in the family Burseraceae.  It occurs in southern China and Indo-China; in Vietnam it may be called trám múi nhọn.  No subspecies are listed in the Catalogue of Life.

References 

Burseraceae
Trees of Vietnam